Hàm Thuận Bắc is a rural district of Bình Thuận province in the Southeast region of Vietnam. In 2003 the district had a population of 156,535. The district capital lies at Ma Lâm.

It is the site of the Hàm Thuận – Đa Mi hydroelectric power stations.

Communes
The district has two town-level (thị trấn) administrative units, Ma Lâm (population 13,391) and Phú Long (population 14,042), and 15 rural communes (xã): Đa Mi where the first dam is located, Đông Tiến, La Dạ, Đông Giang, Thuận Hòa, Hàm Phú, Thuận Minh, Hàm Liêm, Hàm Hiệp, Hàm Chính, Hàm Trí, Hồng Liêm, Hồng Sơn, Hàm Thắng and Hàm Đức.

History
Finds belonging to the Sa Huỳnh culture have been found in the district. Hàm Thuận was established as an administrative area (phủ) in 1832 in the reign of Minh Mạng, and separated into North and South districts in 1983.

References

Districts of Bình Thuận province